White's Cross GAA  is a Gaelic Athletic Association club based to the north of Cork, Ireland. Its playing field is located at Ballinvriskig. Teams are fielded in Gaelic football and hurling. The club participates in Cork GAA competitions and in Seandún board competitions. They contest both hurling and football at junior a level.

History
The club was founded in 1957 and won their first trophy seven years later, the East Cork JHL.

Achievements
 Cork Junior Football Championship Runner-Up 2010
 Cork Junior B Hurling Championship Runner-Up 1991, 2017, winners 2018.
 Cork City Junior Football Championship Winners (4) 2006, 2008, 2009, 2010  | Runner-Up 2005
 City Junior Football League Winners (5) 1994, 2001, 2006, 2009, 2010
 City Junior B Football Championship Winners (1) 1991
 City Junior B Hurling Championship Winners (2) 1991, 2016
 City Junior B Football League Winners (1) 1992
 City Junior B Hurling League Winners (2) 1991, 1999
 MacCurtain Cup Winners (1) 1992
 Seandun Cup Winners (2) 1981, 1991
 McSwiney Cup Winners (10) 2003, 2004, 2005, 2006, 2007, 2008, 2009, 2010, 2011, 2012
 Craobh Rua Cup Winners (3) 1991, 1998 2016
 City Minor A Football Championship Winners (3) 1988, 1990, 1992
 City Minor B Football Championship Winners (2) 2002, 2006
 East Junior Hurling League Winners (1) 1964
 East Junior B Hurling Championship Winners (1) 1982
 East Under 21 "B" Hurling Championship Winners (1) 1977

References

Gaelic games clubs in County Cork
Hurling clubs in County Cork
Gaelic football clubs in County Cork
1957 establishments in Ireland
Gaelic Athletic Association clubs established in 1957